Cape Verde, in Portuguese Cabo Verde, is an island country in West Africa.

Cabo Verde may also refer to:
Cap-Vert, in Portuguese Cabo Verde, peninsula in Senegal
Cabo Verde, Minas Gerais, Brazilian municipality located in the southwest of the state of Minas Gerais
Cabo Verde (album), a 1997 album by the Cape Verdean singer Cesária Évora
Cabo Verde Express, Cape Verdean airline

See also
Cape Verde (disambiguation)